Helga Kurm (11 January 1920 – 7 January 2011) was an Estonian pedagogical scientist. She was docent of the Tartu State University's Pedagogical Division. She authored works such as Sinule, tütarlaps (1970) and Eesti NSV teeneline õpetaja (1975), and Iz Istorii narodnogo obrazovanija Pribaltiki (1977).

References

1920 births
2011 deaths
Estonian social scientists
Academic staff of the University of Tartu
20th-century Estonian educators
People from Kose Parish
Soviet educators